The Pârâul Sec is a left tributary of the river Olt in Romania. It flows into the Olt near Racovița.

References

Rivers of Romania
Rivers of Vâlcea County